Mark David Coxon (born 24 January 1978) is a former English cricketer who played in two List A matches for Wiltshire. He was a right-handed top order batsman who bowled right-arm medium pace. He was born in Salisbury, Wiltshire.

Coxon made his Minor Counties Championship debut for Wiltshire in 1996 against Wales Minor Counties. From 1996 to 2002, he represented the county in 18 Minor Counties Championship matches, scoring 908 runs at an average of 30.26. His highest score was 144 against Shropshire. Coxon also represented Wiltshire in the MCCA Knockout Trophy. His debut in that competition came against Devon in 1998, with him playing one further Trophy match for Wiltshire in 2001 against Cornwall.

References

1978 births
Living people
Sportspeople from Salisbury
People from Wiltshire
English cricketers
Wiltshire cricketers